Hermbstaedtia is a genus of flowering plants belonging to the family Amaranthaceae.

Its native range is Kenya, southern tropical and southern Africa. It is found in the countries of Angola, Botswana, Kenya, Mozambique, Namibia,  Eswatini, Zambia, Zimbabwe and in South Africa (within the regions of Cape Provinces, Free State, KwaZulu-Natal, Northern Provinces).

The genus name of Hermbstaedtia is in honour of Sigismund Friedrich Hermbstädt (1760–1833), a German pharmacist and chemist. It was first described and published in Consp. Regn. Veg. on page 164 in 1828.

Known species
According to Kew:
Hermbstaedtia angolensis 
Hermbstaedtia argenteiformis 
Hermbstaedtia caffra 
Hermbstaedtia capitata 
Hermbstaedtia exellii 
Hermbstaedtia fleckii 
Hermbstaedtia glauca 
Hermbstaedtia gregoryi 
Hermbstaedtia linearis 
Hermbstaedtia nigrescens 
Hermbstaedtia odorata 
Hermbstaedtia scabra 
Hermbstaedtia schaeferi 
Hermbstaedtia spathulifolia

References

Amaranthaceae
Amaranthaceae genera
Plants described in 1828
Flora of Southern Africa
Flora of South Tropical Africa